The Jupiter-C was an American research and development vehicle developed from the Jupiter-A. Jupiter-C was used for three unmanned sub-orbital spaceflights in 1956 and 1957 to test re-entry nosecones that were later to be deployed on the more advanced PGM-19 Jupiter mobile missile. The recovered nosecone was displayed in the Oval Office as part of President Dwight D. Eisenhower's televised speech on November 7, 1957.

A member of the Redstone rocket family, Jupiter-C was designed by the U.S. Army Ballistic Missile Agency (ABMA), under the direction of Wernher von Braun. Three Jupiter-C flights were made followed by three satellite launches (Juno I). All were launched from Cape Canaveral, Florida.

Description 
Each vehicle consisted of a modified Redstone ballistic missile with two solid-propellant upper stages. The tanks of the Redstone were lengthened by 8 ft (2.4 m) to provide additional propellant. The instrument compartment was also smaller and lighter than the Redstone's. The second and third stages were clustered in a "tub" atop the vehicle.

The second stage was an outer ring of eleven scaled-down Sergeant rocket engines; the third stage was a cluster of three scaled-down Sergeant rockets grouped within. These were held in position by bulkheads and rings and surrounded by a cylindrical outer shell. The webbed base plate of the shell rested on a ball bearing shaft mounted on the first-stage instrument section. Two electric motors spun in the tub at a rate varying from 450 to 750 rpm to compensate for thrust imbalance when the clustered motors fired. The rate of spin was varied by a programmer so that it did not couple with the changing resonance frequency of the first stage during flight.

The upper-stage tub was visibly spun-up before launch. During first-stage flight, the vehicle was guided by a gyro-controlled autopilot controlling both air-vanes and jet vanes on the first stage by means of servos. Following a vertical launch from a simple steel table, the vehicle was programmed so that it was traveling at an angle of 40 degrees from the horizontal at burnout of the first stage, which occurred 157 seconds after launch.

At first-stage burnout, explosive bolts fired and springs separated the instrument section from the first-stage tankage. The instrument section and the spinning tub were slowly tipped to a horizontal position by means of four air jets located at the base of the instrument section. When the apex of the vertical flight occurred after a coasting flight of about 247 seconds, a radio signal from the ground ignited the eleven-rocket cluster of the second stage, separating the tub from the instrument section. The third stage then fired to raise the apogee. Through this system, designed by Wernher von Braun in 1956 for his proposed Project Orbiter, the Jupiter-C obviated the need for a guidance system in the upper stages.

Juno I
The Juno I was a satellite launch vehicle based on the Jupiter-C, but with the addition of a fourth stage, atop the "tub" of the third stage and the use of Hydyne as fuel. The Juno name derived from Von Braun wishing to make the satellite launch appear as peaceable as the Vanguard rocket, which was not a weapon, but was developed from a weather study rocket, the Viking. Since the Juno I was the same height as the Jupiter-C (21.2 meters), with the added fourth stage being hidden inside the shell, this vehicle which successfully launched the first orbital satellite of the United States is often incorrectly referred to as a Jupiter-C.

Encrypted serial number
The Jupiter-C was part of the IRBM project, and the sequence of manufacture of the rockets (which are not necessarily launched in order, and may be uprated as solutions to technical problems are worked out in tests)  was considered a military secret. So the designation painted on the sides of the rocket was not a serial number in clear text, but employed a simple transformation cypher that the staff would be sure not to forget. The key was taken from the name of the design and test base: Huntsville, Alabama, giving HUNTSVILE, with duplicated letters dropped: H was used for 1, U for 2, ..., E for 9 and X for 0.
For example, the Jupiter-C modified to launch Explorer 1 had "UE" painted on the side, indicating it was S/N 29 (U→2, E→9).

General characteristics 
 Weight as configured for Explorer 1 launch, loaded/empty
    Overall, takeoff: 64,000 lb (29,000 kg)/10,230 lb (4640 kg)
    Stage 1 62,700 lb (28,400 kg)/9,600 lb (4,400 kg)
    Stage 2 1,020 lb (460 kg)/490 lb (220 kg)
    Stage 3 280 lb (130 kg)/140 lb (64 kg)
 Propulsion
 Stage 1: Rocketdyne A-7 engine
 Thrust, 83,000 lbf (370 kN)
 burning time, 155 s
 specific impulse, 235 s (2.30 kN·s/kg)
 propellants, liquid oxygen, as oxidizer, and alcohol as fuel
 propellant feed, turbopump type
 turbopump drive, 90% hydrogen peroxide decomposed by catalyst bed to produce steam
 Stage 2: Eleven JPL scaled-down Sergeant rockets
 specific impulse, 220 s (2.16 kN·s/kg)
 propellant, polysulfide-aluminum and ammonium perchlorate (solid propellant)
 Stage 3: Three JPL scaled-down Sergeant rockets
 Thrust, 4,500 lbf (24 kN)
 burning time, 6.5 s
 specific impulse, 235 s (2.30 kN·s/kg)
 propellant, same as for Stage 2

Flight history 
 September 20, 1956: lifted an 86.5-lb (39.2 kg) payload (including a 30-lb (14 kg) dummy satellite) to an altitude of 680 mi (1,100 km), a speed of 16,000 mph (7 km/s), and a range of 3,300 mi (5,300 km) from Cape Canaveral, Florida
 May 15, 1957: lifted a 300 lb (140 kg) scale Jupiter ablative nose cone to an altitude of 350 mi (560 km) and a range of 710 mi (1,100 km)
 August 8, 1957: lifted a 1/3-scale Jupiter nose cone to an altitude of 285 mi (460 km) and a range of 1,330 mi (2,140 km); Juno I (four-stage configuration).
 January 31, 1958: launched the Western world's first satellite, Explorer 1

References

Bibliography

1956 in spaceflight
Sounding rockets of the United States
Space launch vehicles of the United States